The 2014 United States Senate election in Rhode Island was held on November 4, 2014 to elect a member of the United States Senate from the State of Rhode Island, concurrently with the election of the Governor of Rhode Island, as well as other elections to the United States Senate in other states and elections to the United States House of Representatives and various state and local elections.

Incumbent Democratic Senator Jack Reed ran for and won reelection to a fourth term in office. Reed won a higher share of the overall vote in his state than any other Democratic Senate candidate or incumbent Democratic United States Senator during the 2014 elections. On the same day that Reed won a fourth term in the United States Senate with more than 70 percent of the vote, national Democrats lost nine seats in the concurrent U.S. Senate elections, thereby costing them control of the chamber.

Background 
Then-U.S. Representative Jack Reed was first elected to the U.S. Senate in 1996 to succeed retiring Democratic incumbent Claiborne Pell, the longest-serving Senator in Rhode Island's history. Reed defeated Treasurer of Rhode Island Nancy Mayer in a landslide and was re-elected by even larger majorities against casino pit manager Robert Tingle in 2002 and 2008.

Rhode Island has elected U.S. Senators into the majority party of the subsequent Congress more than any other state in the nation over the last 100 years at 77 percent of the time.

Democratic primary

Candidates

Declared 
 Jack Reed, incumbent U.S. Senator

Primary results

Republican primary

Candidates

Declared 
 Mark Zaccaria, former Chairman of the Rhode Island Republican Party, former North Kingstown Town Councilman and nominee for RI-02 in 2008 and 2010

Withdrew 
 Raymond McKay, City of Warwick network administrator, President of the Rhode Island Republican Assembly and nominee for the State Senate in 1998
 Kara Young, conservative activist and perennial candidate

Declined 
 Scott Avedisian, Mayor of Warwick
 Brendan Doherty, former Superintendent of the Rhode Island State Police and nominee for Rhode Island's 1st congressional district in 2012
 Allan Fung, Mayor of Cranston (running for Governor)

Primary results

General election

Predictions

Polling

Results

See also 
 2014 United States Senate elections
 2014 United States elections
 2014 United States House of Representatives elections in Rhode Island
 2014 Rhode Island gubernatorial election

References

External links 
 U.S. Senate elections in Rhode Island, 2014 at Ballotpedia
 Campaign contributions at OpenSecrets
 Jack Reed for U.S. Senate

2014
Rhode Island
United States Senate